Chandramukhi is an Indian fantasy television series that premiered on 30 October 2007 on DD National. It stars Piku Sharma in the titular role. It also stars Mamik Singh, Sachin Khurana, Natasha Sinha, Vinod Kapoor, Kruttika Desai, Vindu Dara Singh, Shiva Rindani and Anwar Fatehan. It is loosely based on the folk-tale of Gul-e-Bakawali.

Plot 
This serial story revolves around the tale of Rajkumar vanraj singh.

who turns into an animal(Werewolf) on Amavasya (moonless night) and kills his own people. There's also a curse upon him, whereby his father turned blind after there eye-contact between the two. The only way for Vanraj to restore his father's vision is by getting a particular flower from Princess Chandramukhi's (Piku Sharma) Kingdom - a place where no one comes back alive.

Cast
 Mamik Singh as Rajkumar Suryapratap Singh
 Saadhika Randhawa as Chandramukhi
 Piku Sharma as Chandramukhi / Kalavati
 Sachin Khurana as Rajkumar Vanraj Singh
 Raja Chaudhary as Ranveer Singh
 Natasha Sinha as Rani Padmavati Mahendrapratap Singh
 Vinod Kapoor
 Kruttika Desai as Durgeshwari, a dacoit
 Vindu Dara Singh as Rajkumar Bhanupratap Singh
 Vikramjeet Virk as Vikram Singh
 Anwar Fatehan
 Shiva Rindani
 Dinesh Hingoo

References
7. https://www.tellychakkar.com/tv/tv-news/chandramukhi-its-way-dd1 tellychakkar.com (Retrieved 05-10-2022)

8. https://m.imdb.com/title/tt8602890/plotsummary?ref_=tt_ov_pl

IMDb Retrieved 05-10-2022

External links

Indian fantasy television series
2007 Indian television series debuts
DD National original programming
Indian period television series
Television shows based on fairy tales